Thirumandangudi is a village in the Papanasam taluk of Thanjavur district, Tamil Nadu, India.

Demographics 
At the 2001 census, Thirumandangudi had a total population of 697 with 354 males and 343 females. The sex ratio was 969. The literacy rate was 76.4%.

Temples 
Sri Ranganatha swamy temple is the birthplace of Thondaradippodi Alvar. There is also Srinivasa Perumal next to Thondaradipodi Alvar statue. Since Thondaradippodi Alvar wanted Ranganatha to get up from reclining posture and hence composed Tirupalliyelluchi. That wish was granted to Alvar at this place which is also his birthplace.

References

External links
Photos
Blog

Villages in Thanjavur district